Herviera gliriella is a species of sea snail, a marine gastropod mollusk in the family Pyramidellidae, the pyrams and their allies.

Description
The ovate shell is light brown with darker brown color at the apex and at the base. Its length measures 2.5 mm. The five whorls of the teleoconch show prominent axial ribs that increase gradually in size at the transition between the protoconch and teleoconch. The live animal is cream-colored with white flecks.

Distribution
This species occurs in shallow waters (less than 200 m deep) in the Indian Ocean off East Africa and also in the Eastern Pacific Ocean, off Hawaii and off the Galapagos Islands.

References

 E. Alison Kay (1979), Hawaiian Marine Shells: Reef and Shore Fauna of Hawaii Section 4: Molluscs 
 Finet, Y. (2001) The marine mollusks of the Galapagos Islands: a documented faunal list. Editions du Muséum d' Histoire naturelle, Genève, 237 pp.

External links
 To World Register of Marine Species
 To ITIS
 

Pyramidellidae
Gastropods described in 1896